Ricardo Delgado Araujo (born 24 July 1994) is a Colombian footballer who most recently played for Bogotá FC. He's a right-footed offensive midfielder.

References

External links

1994 births
Living people
Colombian footballers
Colombian expatriate footballers
Envigado F.C. players
Jaguares de Córdoba footballers
Valledupar F.C. footballers
Deportivo Pasto footballers
Bogotá FC footballers
Categoría Primera A players
Categoría Primera B players
Peruvian Primera División players
Association football midfielders
Colombian expatriate sportspeople in Peru
Expatriate footballers in Peru
People from Caquetá Department